Alex Latio Elia (born 12 08 1984) is a South Sudanese Politician. He is currently the Minister of Animal Resources Fisheries and Tourism for Central Equatoria State in the Transitional Government of National Unity (RTGoNU) as of 2023.

Career 
Alex was appointed to the ministerial position when the R-TGoNU was formed in February 2021. Latio is also the leader of National Agenda a registered political party in South Sudan and signatory to the revitalized peace agreement.

In September 2022, Alex Latio cautioned students from the University of Juba over early politics, urging them to prioritize studies.

References

1984 births
South Sudanese politicians
Living people